Oleksandr Viktorovich Zadorozhnii (26 June 1960 – 12 May 2017) was a Ukrainian politician who served as People's Deputy from 1998 to 2006.

He died in May 2017.

Awards
 Order of Merit, First Class (2020 – posthumous)

References

1960 births
2017 deaths
People from Luhansk Oblast
Taras Shevchenko National University of Kyiv, Institute of International Relations alumni
Ukrainian jurists
Third convocation members of the Verkhovna Rada
Fourth convocation members of the Verkhovna Rada
Recipients of the Order of Merit (Ukraine), 1st class
Recipients of the Order of Merit (Ukraine), 3rd class
Laureates of the Honorary Diploma of the Verkhovna Rada of Ukraine